The Carroll Mansion (also known as the Carroll-Caton House or Carroll Mansion Museum) is a historic building and museum located in Baltimore, Maryland, USA.

History
The house was built around 1811, at the corner of what is now known as Lombard and Front Streets, which at the time was a very wealthy part of Baltimore. In 1818 it was purchased for the sum of $20,000 by Richard Caton, the husband of Mary, youngest daughter of Charles Carroll of Carrollton, a signer of the Declaration of Independence. For the last twelve years of his life, Charles Carroll spent his winters in the house, often receiving distinguished visitors there. It was in this house that he died.

The Catons continued to reside at the mansion until 1846, when the last of the Caton family died.

The mansion remained empty for the next eleven years and was purchased in 1855 by the Sisters of Mercy. The neighborhood underwent a drastic change in the eleven years prior to 1855 and had gone from the wealthiest part of town to the home of poor immigrants. The Sisters of Mercy rented the once grand mansion to immigrants who turned the first floor into a saloon and the second floor into apartments for German and Russian Jews, until 1868 when the Sisters sold the mansion for the paltry sum of $1,000.

Over the next forty years, Carroll Mansion served as a saloon, furniture store, and in 1904 news articles report that the mansion was being used as a sweatshop to produce clothing.

In 1914 the mansion was deeded to the City of Baltimore and in 1918 it became Baltimore's first vocational school. The mansion's larger rooms were used as classrooms and the grounds housed the various trade shops. The vocational school continued to operate and offer courses in tailoring, printing, and auto mechanics until 1928. In 1928 the Carroll Mansion was restored and opened to the public with exhibits of antiques.

The Carroll Mansion underwent major renovations in 1935 to include showers, indoor toilets, and a new heating system and served as The Carroll Mansion Recreation Center from 1937 to 1954, at which time the doors were closed once again.

In the 1960s the mansion was slated to be torn down and a gas station built where the mansion stood for the last 150 years. The citizens of Baltimore protested said plans, and upon his election in 1962, on a platform emphasizing urban renewal, Mayor Theodore McKeldin pledged that the historic Carroll Mansion would be fully restored. After major restoration efforts, the doors of the Carroll Mansion opened to the public once again in 1967 as a museum and a collection of antiques to mirror the 1820s and 1830s when the Caton and Carroll families occupied the mansion was started. In 1985 the mansion became part of the Baltimore City Life Museums and the collection was expanded to include wallpaper, paint, china, silver, and furniture of the 1820s and 1830s. The mansion operated as a museum for thirty years, from 1967 to 1997, when the doors closed yet again.

The museum remained closed until 2002 when Carroll Museums, Inc. reopened the museum. The Carroll Museum remains open today where tours are offered to the public.  Changing art exhibits are also displayed.

Architecture
The Carroll Mansion is one of Baltimore's best examples of Federal Period architecture.  It was listed on the National Register of Historic Places in 1973.

References

External links
Carroll Museums, Inc.: The Carroll Mansion & Phoenix Shot Tower
Baltimore, Maryland, a National Park Service Discover Our Shared Heritage Travel Itinerary
, including photo from 1999, at Maryland Historical Trust
 Carroll Mansion at Explore Baltimore Heritage

Carroll Mansion on Google Street View

Jonestown, Baltimore
Museums in Baltimore
Houses on the National Register of Historic Places in Baltimore
Historic American Buildings Survey in Baltimore
Historic house museums in Maryland
Federal architecture in Maryland
Houses completed in 1811
Carroll family residences
Houses in Baltimore
Baltimore City Landmarks